Khaled Baleid (Arabic: خالد بلعيد) (born 2 November 1986) is a Yemeni retired professional footballer who played primarily  as a  left winger and last played for Salgaocar SC in the I-League. He represented Yemen national football team in 21 senior international matches between 2003 and 2013.

Club career

Al-Tilal SC
Baleid began his professional career in the Yemeni Pro League side Al-Tilal SC in 2001. He won the 2005 Yemeni League with the club alongside the Yemeni President Cup in 2007 and 2010. In 2003, he was also in the club's Naseem Cup winning squad.

Baleid appeared in the 2011 AFC Cup and debuted against Dempo SC.

Salgaocar FC
In 2015, Baleid signed with Indian I-league side Salgaocar FC. According to Derrick Pereira, Baleid was found most suited player in his team.

He debuted for the club on 21 March against Bengaluru FC in a 1-0 defeat. He played 10 matches for the Goa-based side.

International career
Baleid was a regular youth international who represented Yemen in U-17, U-20 and U-23 teams from 2003 to 2005. He was a member of the Yemen national under-17 football team at the 2003 FIFA U-17 World Championship in Finland.

In senior career, Baleid debuted for the Yemeni national team against Oman on 28 December 2003 at the 16th Arabian Gulf Cup. He appeared in 31 international matches for his country and scored 2 goals.

International statistics
Scores and results list Yemen's goal tally first.

Honours

Club
Al-Tilal
Yemeni League
 Champions (1): 2004–05
Yemeni Presidents Cup
 Champions (2): 2007, 2010
 Runners-up (1): 2009
Yemeni Naseem Cup (1)
 Champions (1): 2003
 al-Murisi Cup (1)
 Champions (1): 2003

Country
Yemen U17 FIFA U-17 World Cup
Group Stage: 2003
 [[2002 AFC U-17 Championship|AFC U-17 Championship]]
Runner-up: 2002 AFC U-17 Championship

See also
 List of Yemeni expatriate footballers

References

External links 
 

1986 births
Living people
Yemeni footballers
Yemen international footballers
Yemeni expatriate footballers
Yemeni expatriate sportspeople in India
Expatriate footballers in India
Yemeni League players
I-League players
Al-Tilal SC players
Salgaocar FC players
Association football fullbacks
Association football wingers